Anthony Banks (born March 4, 1966) is an American record producer and rapper from Oakland, California.

Biography

As a child, he took part in a band at school and then learned to play a variety of instruments along the way. At school he only learned classical music, but at home he taught himself to play funk music like Parliament, Funkadelic and The Gap Band on his digital keyboard. Interested in making music, he would create beats and record his own versions for fun.

Banks would later record tapes with his friend, Oakland rapper MC Ant, and sell them at their high school out the trunk of their cars. With the lyrics handled by MC Ant and the production by Ant Banks, buzz over the tapes eventually reached the streets, resulting in popularity throughout the city.

In 1987, Banks recorded the debut album by MC Ant titled The Great, which was later released in 1989 through Raw Dog Records. In 1989, he recorded the debut album Let It Be Known by East Bay rapper Spice 1, which was later released in 1991 through Triad Records. Along with the releases of Pooh-Man and Dangerous Dame, Banks managed to sell in the range of 100,000 to 300,000 units with all four albums, without a record label or promotion. This turned him into a prominent figure in the Bay Area hip-hop scene by the early '90s.

He has produced songs for Too Short, E-40, Spice 1, Snoop Dogg and 3X Krazy to name a few. In 1993, he engaged in a beef with Oakland rapper Pooh-Man.

In 1996, Banks appeared on the Red Hot Organization's compilation CD, America Is Dying Slowly, alongside Biz Markie, Wu-Tang Clan, and Fat Joe, among many other prominent hip hop artists. The CD, meant to raise awareness of the AIDS epidemic among African American men, was heralded as "a masterpiece" by The Source magazine.

In 1999 Banks started a group T.W.D.Y. (acronym for "The Whole Damn Yay"). Banks himself, Rappin' 4-Tay and Captain Save'm were the original members. Their debut album Derty Werk was released in 1999 and contained the single "Players Holiday", featuring Too Short, Mac Mall, Otis & Shug. The single received a lot of radio play. Also, Ant Banks settled his long time beef with Pooh-Man when they appeared together on the track, "Ride Wit Me". In 2000, T.W.D.Y. released their second and final album Lead the Way; Ant Banks and Captain Save'm remained while Dolla Will replaced Rappin' 4-Tay.

He is also known as "The Big Badass" and released an album of the same name in 1994. His talent for producing "funky" bass lines are well known and have achieved cross-over appreciation in the techno niche. The album liner for Daft Punk's album Homework gives a note of appreciation to Ant Banks for inspiration.

Discography

Studio albums
Sittin' on Somethin' Phat (1993)
The Big Badass (1994)
Do or Die (1995)

Collaboration albums 
Don't Try This at Home with The Dangerous Crew (1995)
Derty Werk with T.W.D.Y. (1999)
Lead the Way with T.W.D.Y. (2000)

Compilation albums
Big Thangs (1997)
The Best of Ant Banks (1998)

Production discography
1989
MC Ant - The Great
1990
Pooh-Man - Teardrops (EP)
Pooh-Man - Life of a Criminal
1991
Spice 1 - Let It Be Known (EP)
Various Artists - Juice
Dangerous Dame - The Bomb (Single)
1992
Dangerous Dame - Same Ole Dame
Pooh-Man - Funky As I Wanna Be
Spice 1 - Spice 1
Too Short - Shorty the Pimp
1993
Dru Down - Fools From the Streets
Spice 1 - 187 He Wrote
Too Short - Get in Where You Fit In
Various Artists - Menace II Society
1994
Dru Down - Explicit Game
Goldy - In The Land Of Funk
Rappin' 4-Tay - Don't Fight the Feelin'
Spice 1 - AmeriKKKa's Nightmare
Various Artists - B-Ball's Best Kept Secret
1995
Gangsta P - Meet The Lil Gangsta
Rappin' Ron & Ant Diddley Dog - Bad N-Fluenz
South Central Cartel - S.C.C. Presents Murder Squad Nationwide
Spice 1 - 1990-Sick
Too Short - Cocktails
1996
C.R.I.S.I.S. - Crazy Real Insane Soldiers In Sacramento
E-40 - Tha Hall of Game
Mac Mall - Untouchable
Mr. ILL - Rebirth
Too Short - Gettin' It
Various Artists - America Is Dying Slowly
1997
187 Fac - Fac Not Fiction
3X Krazy - Stackin' Chips
Mack 10 - Based on a True Story
MC Breed - Flatline
Rappin' 4-Tay - 4 Tha Hard Way
Spice 1 - The Black Bossalini (a.k.a. Dr. Bomb from Da Bay)
Various Artists - In tha Beginning…There Was Rap
1998
Bad Azz - Word on tha Streets
E-40 - The Element of Surprise
Eightball - Lost
MC Ren - Ruthless for Life
Mean Green - Major Players Compilation
Rappin' 4-Tay - Bigga Than Da Game
WC - The Shadiest One
Various Artists - Straight Outta Compton: N.W.A 10th Anniversary Tribute
Various Artists - Woo
1999
B-Legit - Hempin' Ain't Easy
CJ Mac - Platinum Game
E-40 - Charlie Hustle: The Blueprint of a Self-Made Millionaire
MC Eiht - Section 8
Snoop Dogg - No Limit Top Dogg
Suge Knight - Represents: Chronic 2000
Too Short - Can't Stay Away
2000
Captain Save 'Em - My Cape is in the Cleaners
Dual Committee - Dual Committee
Too Short - You Nasty
Various Artists - Romeo Must Die
Various Artists - Too Gangsta for Radio
2001
The Click - Money & Muscle
Too Short - Chase the Cat
2002
Celly Cel - Song'z U Can't Find
King T - The Kingdom Come
Too Short - What's My Favorite Word?
2003
Too Short - Married to the Game
2004
E-40 - The Best of E-40: Yesterday, Today and Tomorrow
Hussein Fatal - Fatalveli, Volume 2: The Mixtape
2007
V-White - Perfect Timin'''
2019
Dann G & MC Magic - Special Lady2020
Too Short & E-40 - Triple Gold Sox2021
Chris Lockett - Man UpChris Lockett - Stay With Me2022
Mount Westmore - GhettoKhoree The Poet - All On MeKhoree The Poet - Grown Man Ish''

References

External links
Ant Banks at Discogs
Ant Banks on Myspace

1966 births
Living people
21st-century American male musicians
21st-century American rappers
African-American male rappers
American hip hop record producers
Gangsta rappers
G-funk artists
Jive Records artists
Rappers from Oakland, California
Record producers from California
West Coast hip hop musicians
21st-century African-American musicians
20th-century African-American people